Simpang Empat or Simpang Ampat is a small town located in Perlis, Malaysia.

References

Towns in Perlis